Steane is both a surname and a given name. Notable people with the name include:

Surname
Andrew Steane, Professor of physics at the University of Oxford
Dick Steane (1939–2007), British athlete
J. B. Steane (1928–2011), English music critic, musicologist, literary scholar and teacher

Given name
Steane Kremerskothen, Australian rules football player from Tasmania

See also
Steane code, mathematical tool introduced by Andrew Steane
Steene
Stene
R v Steane, 1947 case decided by the English Court of Criminal Appeal